Sigapatella is a genus of small to medium-sized sea snails, marine gastropod molluscs in the family Calyptraeidae, the slipper snails, Chinese hat snails, and cup-and-saucer snails.

Taxonomy
This group of species was originally classified under Calyptraea (Sigapatella)  by Lesson in 1830. In 1990 the subgenus was elevated to the rank of genus as Sigapatella by Beu et al.  and confirmed in 2000 by Camacho et al. (2000)

Description
The oval shell has a lateral apex. The interior plate has a submarginal axis. The free margin is concave.

Species
Species within the genus Sigapatella include:
 † Sigapatella americana Ortmann 1900 
 Sigapatella calyptraeformis (Lamarck) 
 † Sigapatella crater (Finlay, 1926)
 † Sigapatella gigantea (Beu, 1970)
 Sigapatella hedleyi (Smith, 1915) Hedley's shelf limpet 
 † Sigapatella maccoyi (Suter, 1917)
† Sigapatella mapalia Marwick, 1929 
 Sigapatella novaezelandiae (Lesson, 1830) 
 Sigapatella nukumaruana Marshall, 2003 
 Sigapatella ohopeana Marshall, 2003 
 † Sigapatella otamatea Laws, 1944
 † Sigapatella patulosa Powell and Bartrum, 1929 
 † Sigapatella perampla (Powell & Bartrum, 1929)
 Sigapatella spadicea Boshier, 1961  
 † Sigapatella subvaricosa Powell & Bartrum, 1929
 Sigapatella superstes Fleming, 1958  
 Sigapatella tenuis (Gray, 1867) 
 Sigapatella terraenovae (Peile, 1924) 
 Sigapatella subvaricosa Powell and Partrum, 1929  
 † Sigapatella vertex J. Marwick, 1926 

 † Sigapatella (Spirogalerus) lamellaria (Finlay & Marwick, 1937) (synonym: Spirogalerus lamellaria Finlay & Marwick 1937) 

Species brought into synonymy
 Sigapatella maculata Suter, 1913 : synonym of Sigapatella novaezelandiae (Lesson, 1830)

References

 Powell A. W. B., New Zealand Mollusca, William Collins Publishers Ltd, Auckland, New Zealand 1979 
 Paleopbiology Database : Sigapatella

Calyptraeidae
Gastropods of Australia
Gastropods of New Zealand
Gastropod genera
Taxa named by René Lesson